Lindsey Buckingham Christine McVie (also referred to as simply Buckingham McVie) is a studio album by Fleetwood Mac vocalists Lindsey Buckingham and Christine McVie, released on June 9, 2017. Four of the five "classic members" of Fleetwood Mac are featured on the album; vocalist Stevie Nicks is the sole member absent. The album sold over 22,000 units in the United States in its first week and debuted within the top 20. It proved to be even more successful in the United Kingdom, where it debuted at No. 5. In November 2017, the album was also certified silver with sales exceeding 60,000 units. It was McVie's last album before her death in 2022.

Background
A few months after McVie rejoined Fleetwood Mac in 2014, she and Buckingham met at Studio D at the Village Recorder in Los Angeles, where the band recorded the Tusk album in 1979. Fleetwood Mac's rhythm section of Mick Fleetwood and John McVie drums and bass for the sessions. After two months, they had recorded eight songs, including "Carnival Begin", "Too Far Gone" and "Red Sun". Recording was then put on hold when Fleetwood Mac began preparations for their On with the Show tour. While Buckingham and McVie were able to rekindle their musical chemistry during these sessions, neither of them expected the project to progress any further, although they opted to resume progress on the project following the completion of their 2014-15 tour.

In 2015, Mick Fleetwood was still hopeful that Stevie Nicks would contribute songs for the project, stating that “My inclination is, the music will not be wasted. It will come out one way or another. I truly hope and I quietly believe it will be Fleetwood Mac, and Stevie will do some lovely stuff, and within the next couple of years we will get that done.” However, Nicks revealed in 2016 that she was still undecided about recording another Fleetwood Mac album. McVie and Buckingham ultimately decided to proceed without Nicks as a duo, albeit with John McVie and Mick Fleetwood's respective parts retained. Work commenced at the end of 2016, more than two years after the initial recording sessions.

In the album's early stages, McVie sent Buckingham some demos to work on. McVie contributed lyrics and helped Buckingham develop his own compositions. "She would write lyrics and maybe paraphrase the melody — and come up with something far better than what I would have done if I'd taken it down the road myself." Two of those songs, "Red Sun" and "Too Far Gone", started off in this fashion.

The complete track list was released on April 11, 2017, with Buckingham releasing this joint statement: "We were exploring a creative process, and the identity of the project took on a life organically. The body of work felt like it was meant to be a duet album. We acknowledged that to each other on many occasions, and said to ourselves, 'What took us so long?!'" "Feel About You" was released on April 27 as a promotional single. Co-written by both Buckingham and McVie, Rolling Stone described the track as "bubbly pop-rock" in nature with a "jangly, infectious chorus". Buckingham confessed that the track was primarily McVie's composition, but altered it enough to warrant a co-writing credit.

"Sleeping Around the Corner", the album's opening track, was previously included as a bonus track on the US digital edition of Buckingham's 2011 solo album, Seeds We Sow. McVie took an immediate liking to the track, prompting Buckingham to finish it off.

Buckingham and McVie released a mini behind-the scenes documentary in May discussing the development of various tracks, including "On With the Show" and "Carnival Begin". McVie reflected on her experience in the studio coming out of her sabbatical from the music industry: 
"For me, this is all a fresh beginning. I didn't know myself I'd end up coming back into the band after so long: 16 years...I guess I've rediscovered my love for writing and my love for music. I seemed to have evolved quite organically because I've been sending Lindsey some rough demos; He's refined them and shaped them into some of our best material ever."

Release
On March 24, 2017, McVie announced that the album would see a worldwide launch on June 9, 2017, and would be available for purchase on "iTunes and vinyl – it will be available everywhere". "In My World" was also released as a single on April 14 through streaming and digital services. While the single failed to make the UK Top 100, it did reach #86 on the sales chart. Both the album's second and third singles, "Red Sun" and "Feel About You", received minor airplay, particularly on the BBC 2 playlist.

Live performances

On April 11, 2017, a 14-date North American tour was announced. Eight of the album's ten tracks were played live, with the rest of the set list consisting of Fleetwood Mac songs and Buckingham solo cuts. Their performance in Woodinville, Washington took place just three days after Fleetwood Mac's joint performance with Earth, Wind & Fire and Journey at Classic West. The Wallflowers opened for the band on select nights. In June, the band appeared on The Tonight Show Starring Jimmy Fallon to perform the album's first single, "In My World".

Some extra North American shows were later added in August, including one in Los Angeles and another in New York City.  Another North American leg began in October, which saw the addition of 22 more shows.

Critical reception

At Metacritic, which assigns a weighted average rating out of 100 to reviews from mainstream publications, the album received a score of 72, based on 20 reviews. Thom Jurek of AllMusic singled out the first three songs as "absolute knockouts". He labelled "Red Sun", “Love Is Here to Stay", and "Carnival Begin" as the other standouts.

Commercial performance
The album debuted at No. 17 on Billboard 200 with 23,000 equivalent album units, 22,000 of which were in traditional album sales. The chart ranking is higher than either of the two artists' solo projects. UK sales exceeded 19,000 units, which was enough to vault the album to the No. 5 spot. It debuted at No. 3 in the Sales Chart.

Track listing

  signifies a co-producer

Personnel 
 Lindsey Buckingham – vocals, guitars, keyboards, bass, drums, percussion, programming
 Christine McVie – vocals, keyboards

Additional personnel
 Mitchell Froom – keyboards
 John McVie – bass
 Mick Fleetwood – drums, percussion

Production
 Lindsey Buckingham – recording (1, 3, 5, 7, 9), mixing 
 Mark Needham – recording (1, 2, 4, 5, 6, 8, 10), mixing (1, 2, 4–10)
 Ben O'Neill – recording (2, 4, 6, 8, 10)
 David Boucher – recording (3, 7, 9)
 Stephen Marcussen – mastering at Marcussen Mastering (Hollywood, California)
 Jeri Heiden – design 
 John Russo – photography 
 Irving Azoff, Blain Clausen, Adam Flick, Carl Stubner and Martin Wyatt – management team

Charts

Certifications

References

External links
 

2017 albums
Fleetwood Mac
Albums produced by Lindsey Buckingham
Albums produced by Mitchell Froom
Lindsey Buckingham albums
Christine McVie albums
Vocal duet albums
Albums produced by Mark Needham
Atlantic Records albums
East West Records albums